Shabbat Dinner is a short 2012 film written, directed, and edited by Michael Morgenstern. It was released on YouTube in January 2014. It is an ensemble piece that tells the story of two closeted gay teenagers whose families get together for Shabbat Dinner. After dinner, and unbeknownst to their parents, the two boys reveal their sexuality to each other.

Plot 
The film follows a Shabbat dinner party between two young families. After a dinner of superficial conversation between the adults, two teenaged boys William (Chris London) and Virgo (Dan Shaked) go to William's room. Virgo reveals to William he is gay, and William insists he is straight. Outside, their parents talk about religion, William's father exclaiming that all good Jews should marry Jewish and keep kosher. Back in William's room the sexual tension is building, and William leans in to kiss Virgo. Soon, the teenagers hear their parents calling, and they struggle to get their clothes on before being found out. William's father opens the door to the room. There's a quick cut to the families saying goodbye at the door, as William looks anxiously at his father looking sourly at the floor.

Cast 

 Chris London as William Shore
 Dan Shaked as Virgo Bernstein-Cohen
 Eva Kaminsky as Rebecca Shore
 Michael Wikes as Arnold Shore
 Peter Tedeschi as David Bernstein-Cohen
 Dawn Yanek as Susan Bernstein-Cohen

Recognition 

Shabbat Dinner premiered in March 2012 at the Hong Kong International Film Festival and has been screened in 55 film festivals worldwide. It won the following awards:
 Audience Choice Award, Zero Film Festival
 Crystal Cactus, Best Gay Film, Out in the Desert Film Festival
 Audience Choice Award, Barcelona International Gay & Lesbian Film Festival
 Audience Choice Award, 2nd place, Miami Gay & Lesbian Film Festival
 Best Comedy, Amsterdam Gay & Lesbian Film Festival

References

External links

2012 short films
2012 films
Films about Jews and Judaism
American LGBT-related short films
2010s English-language films
2010s American films
Films about LGBT and Judaism
American drama short films